The Guangzhou Evergrande Football Stadium is a football stadium under construction in Guangzhou, China as the future home venue of Chinese professional club Guangzhou F.C. The construction of the 12 billion yuan (US$1.7 billion) stadium began on 16 April 2020. The design of the lotus-shaped stadium was that of Shanghai-based American architect Hasan Syed. The stadium has a seating capacity for 100,000 people and a planned opening set in December 2022. 

In September 2021, the Evergrande Group said that the construction of the stadium would still proceed despite the company's liquidity crisis. In November 2021, the stadium was seized by the Chinese government with plans to sell the incomplete stadium to another company or transfer ownership to the state-owned Guangzhou City Construction Investment Group. At that time construction of the stadium was reportedly halted for at least three months already, contradicting Evergrande's earlier statement.

References

Football venues in Guangzhou
Stadiums under construction